The Dom Pedro V Theatre is a historical theatre situated at Largo de Santo Agostinho in São Lourenço, Macau, China. It is one of the first western-style theatres in East Asia. The theater is an important landmark in the region and remains a venue for important public events and celebrations today.

History
The theatre was built in 1860 by the local Portuguese to commemorate their reigning  king, Peter V. It used to be a regular meeting place for the Portuguese and Macanese people living in Macau. Its current façade was added in 1873. The theater was used as a refugee shelter in the World War II. In 2005, the theater became one of the designated sites of the Historic Centre of Macau enlisted on the UNESCO World Heritage List. In August 2017, the portico ceiling of the theater was damaged due to Typhoon Hato.

Architecture
The theater is neo-classical in design, incorporating a portico front on a rectilinear plan. The building is 41.5 metres long and 22 metres wide. Apart from being a theatre, it features a ballroom, a study room, and a billiard room.

Hosted the Italian opera Madama Butterfly's premiere in Asia.
Undergone various reconstructions throughout its history. It discontinued operating and was left unused for almost two decades due to structural corrosion by termites before reopened in 1993 after large scale renovations.

See also 
 Dom Pedro
 List of oldest buildings and structures in Macau

References

External links
Theatre website

Theatres in Macau
Historic Centre of Macau
Buildings and structures in Macau
Commercial buildings completed in 1860
Landmarks in Macau
Macau Peninsula
Portuguese Macau
1860 establishments in China
1860 establishments in the Portuguese Empire
19th-century establishments in Macau
Portuguese colonial architecture in China